Mohammed Fenaitel Mohamed Al Daihani is a citizen of Kuwait who was held in extrajudicial detention in the United States Guantanamo Bay detention camp, in Cuba. Al Daihani's Guantanamo Internment Serial Number was 229. Joint Task Force Guantanamo counter-terrorism analysts reports that Al Daihani was born on November 4, 1965, in Kuwait City, Kuwait. Al Dehani was repatriated without charges on November 2, 2005.

Combatant Status Review 

A Summary of Evidence memo was prepared for his tribunal. The memo listed the following:

On March 3, 2006, in order to comply with a court order, the Department of Defense published a twelve-page summarized transcript from his Tribunal.

Administrative Review Board 

Detainees whose Combatant Status Review Tribunal labeled them "enemy combatants" were scheduled for annual Administrative Review Board hearings.  These hearings were designed to assess the threat a detainee might pose if released or transferred, and whether there were other factors that warranted his continued detention.

Summary of Evidence memo

A Summary of Evidence memo was prepared for Mohammed Fenaitel Mohamed Al Daihani's Administrative Review Board, on April 22, 2005.
The memo listed factors for and against his continued detention.

The following primary factors favor continued detention

The following primary factors favor release or transfer

Transcript

On March 3, 2006, in  compliance with a court order, the Department of Defense published a two-page summarized transcript of his hearing.

Press reports

Canadian journalist, and former special assistant to US President George W. Bush, David Frum, published an article based on his own reading of the transcripts from the Combatant Status Review Tribunals, on November 11, 2006. It was Frum who coined the term "Axis of evil" for use in a speech he wrote for Bush. Al Daihani's transcript was one of the nine Frum briefly summarized. His comment on Al Daihani was:

Frum came to the conclusion that all nine of the men whose transcript he summarized had obviously lied. He did not, however, state how he came to the conclusion they lied. His article concluded with the comment:

Al Odah v. United States
Mohammed Fenaitel Mohamed Al Daihani was among the eleven captives covered in the July 2008 "Petitioners' Status Report" filed by David J. Cynamon in Al Odah v. United States on behalf of the four remaining Kuwaiti prisoners in Guantanamo. Seven other prisoners were amalgamated to the case, which charged that none of the men had been cleared for release, even though the government had completed factual returns for them—and those factual returns had contained redacted sections.

The decision, striking down the Military Commissions Act, was handed down on  June 12, 2008.

Repatriation

On May 12, 2007, the Kuwait Times reported that the USA concluded negotiations regarding the repatriation of the remaining Kuwaiti captives.

References

Living people
Guantanamo detainees known to have been released
1965 births
People from Kuwait City